Herrickia is a North American genus of flowering plants in the family Asteraceae, native to the western United States. All the species were included in Aster before molecular studies triggered the splitting of that genus into several distinct genera.

 Species
 Herrickia glauca - Arizona, New Mexico, Colorado, Utah, Wyoming, Montana, Idaho
 Herrickia horrida - New Mexico, Colorado
 Herrickia kingii - Utah
 Herrickia wasatchensis - Arizona, Utah

References

Flora of the Western United States
Asteraceae genera
Astereae